Buskiidae is a family of bryozoans belonging to the order Ctenostomatida.

Genera:
 Buskia Alder, 1857
 Cryptopolyzoon Dendy, 1900

References

Bryozoan families